Advances in Librarianship is a peer-reviewed academic journal covering library and information science. It was established in 1999 and is published by Emerald Group. They describe themselves as a "key resource for practitioners, researchers, students and faculty members seeking in-depth literature  and solutions to current and emerging issues in the fields of library and information science and related fields".

References

External links 

English-language journals
Publications established in 1999